Eugene Williams Sr. is an author, educator, and inventor who was born on November 23, 1942 in Orange County, Virginia, in the United States. He is the father of author, educator, and motivational speaker, Eugene Williams Jr.

Education 
Williams attended a segregated school in central Virginia. As an adult, he received a bachelor's degree in English from Saint Paul's College in 1964, a master's degree in Administration and Supervision from The University of Virginia in 1968, and a doctor of education in Curriculum and Instruction from the University of Miami in 1972. He became a member of Alpha Phi Alpha while attending Saint Paul's College.

Career 
In 1964 Williams began his career in Education as an English teacher at Jackson P. Burley High School in Charlottesville, Virginia. After receiving his doctorate, he became the Coordinator of Secondary Education at Howard University from 1972 to 1978. In 1978 he served as a Senior Research Scientist and Curriculum Designer for Lawrence Johnson & Associates, Inc. In 1980 he served briefly as a Supervisor of Instruction for the D.C. Public School System, and later became the Dean of Sojourner-Douglass College in Baltimore, Maryland. In 1983 he became the Assistant Principal at Dunbar High School in Washington, D.C.

In 1989 Williams was chosen to be the Director of Test Improvement for the D.C. Public School System. In 1999, Williams developed and coordinated a vocational training program for the University of the District of Columbia.

Williams is also the President and founder of Academic Resources Unlimited Inc., a 501C3 tax-exempt organization that provides tutoring in Reading, Math, SAT Prep along with publishing opportunities for teachers, students, and administrators.

Inventor 
In 1979 Williams invented The Audiovisual Portfolio, and received the patent for it on March 27, 1981.

Publications 
 Getting the Job You Want with the Audiovisual Portfolio: A Practical Guide for Job Hunters and Career Changers Comptex Associates, 1981
 Keys to Quick Writing Skills: Sentence Combining and Text Reconstruction (w/ Dr. Myra Linden and Dr. Arthur Whimbey) The Right Combination, 1992
 Blueprint for Educational Change: Improving Reasoning, Literacies, and Science Achievement with Cooperative Learning (w/ Dr. Mary Johnson, Dr. Myra Linden, and Dr. Arthur Whimbey) Ebsco Curriculum Material, 1992.
 It's A Reading Thing...Help Your Child Understand: A Parent's Guide to Improving Students' Verbal Performance on Standardized Examinations Like the PSAT and SAT (w/ Robin Bennefield and Eugene Williams Jr.) Comptex Associates, 1992
 Grounded In The Word: A Guide to Mastering Standardized Test Vocabulary and Biblical Comprehension (w/ Eugene Williams Jr.) Comptex Associates, 1997
 The Secret: His Word Impacting Our Lives Academic Resources Unlimited, Inc., 2007

References

American inventors
Living people
1942 births
Saint Paul's College (Virginia) alumni
Curry School of Education alumni
University of Miami School of Education alumni
University of the District of Columbia people